BOH Plantations Sdn Bhd (doing business as BOH) is the largest black tea manufacturer in Malaysia, with both domestic and international distribution owned by BOH Plantations Sdn Bhd. The BOH Tea Plantation, which is located at Cameron Highlands, Pahang, Malaysia, is also the largest tea plantation in Malaysia.

BOH Plantations was founded in 1929 by J. A. Russell, a British-born British-educated businessman during the British colonial era in Malaya. Russell arrived in Kuala Lumpur at age seven, in 1890; the primary export was then tin. Prior to BOH, Russell had worked in the Straits Trading Company, learning to speak several Chinese dialects (along with Malay) and made contacts with wealthy Chinese tin miners. Besides investing in tin, Russell and his brothers (Philip, Donald, and Robert) invested in the nascent rubber industry in 1908. J. A. and Philip also invested in railway-related construction, including the new Kuala Lumpur railway station. In 1913, Russell purchased almost a third of the real estate in the town of Ipoh. He and Donald (a mining engineer from the Colorado School of Mines) founded a colliery at Batu Arang, in Selangor around 25 kilometres from the capital.

History 

Despite the worldwide Great Depression at the time BOH was founded in 1929, Russell was optimistic about the tea plantation business, due to steady demand. Russell was granted a concession of land (together with veteran tea-planter A.B. Milne from Ceylon) for the first BOH tea garden in Habu (it was also the first tea garden in the Cameron Highlands). At the time, the land was undeveloped jungle terrain, on steep slopes; with a steamroller and mule-teams, the stepped plantation was created.

As of 2016, BOH Plantations owns four tea gardens: in Habu (the original), Fairlie Tea Garden, Sungai Palas Tea Garden, and Bukit Cheeding in Selangor. There is a packaging factory near the main garden. BOH offers factory tours. Together, these four plantations total about 1200 hectares of land, and produce about 4 million kg of tea every year, accounting for about 70% of Malaysian tea output.

See also 
 List of tea companies

References

External links

Tea companies of Malaysia
Plantations
Agriculture companies established in 1929
Food and drink companies established in 1929
1929 establishments in British Malaya
Privately held companies of Malaysia
Plantations